Tripogonella is a genus of flowering plants belonging to the family Poaceae.

Its native range is Tropical and Subtropical America, Africa, New Guinea to Australia.

Species:
 Tripogonella loliiformis (F.Muell.) P.M.Peterson & Romasch. 
 Tripogonella minima (A.Rich.) P.M.Peterson & Romasch. 
 Tripogonella spicata (Nees) P.M.Peterson & Romasch.

References

Poaceae
Poaceae genera